"Lips of an Angel" is a song by American rock band Hinder, produced and co-written by Brian Howes and Joseph Lombardo. It was released in July 2006 as the second single from their 2005 debut album, Extreme Behavior. It was their breakthrough hit, charting within the top ten on several US Billboard genre charts, reaching number three on the all-genre Billboard Hot 100, and peaking at number one in Australia and New Zealand. It has sold 3.6 million copies in the US as of January 2015, making it one of the most downloaded rock songs.

Jack Ingram released a cover of the song in 2006, which reached number 16 on the Billboard Hot Country Songs chart.

Content
The lyrics deal with the singer describing his feelings when his favored girlfriend from his past calls late at night, somewhat pleasantly interrupting his current relationship. More than once, a reference to the call being secret is made, and the singer expresses concern of a fight ensuing as a result. The song concludes just as it began, with the singer questioning to why she is calling so late. However, at the end, it is less literal and more figurative, with the underlying meaning of "so late" not at night, but too late in life, perhaps adding an element of sadness to the song, as it ends with the plot unresolved.

Drummer Cody Hanson said the lyrics were based on an experience singer Austin John Winkler had:

Chart performance
The song experienced the most success in Australia. On the chart date of February 4, 2007, the song debuted atop Australia's ARIA Singles Chart, replacing Evermore's "Light Surrounding You" and keeping the peak position for seven weeks before being replaced by "Straight Lines" by Silverchair. On February 12, it reached the top spot on New Zealand's RIANZ Singles Chart and stayed there for one more week before being dethroned by "This Ain't a Scene, It's an Arms Race" by Fall Out Boy. In the United States, the song reached number one on the Billboard Pop 100 and Mainstream Top 40 charts, and number three on the Billboard Hot 100 and Mainstream Rock Tracks charts, in November 2006. It was also their only top-ten single on the Modern Rock Tracks (now Alternative Songs) chart, reaching number eight. Elsewhere, the song had limited chart success and remains Hinder's only hit in most countries in which it charted.

Formats and track listings
Digital download
 "Lips of an Angel" – 4:21

CD single
 "Lips of an Angel" – 4:21
 "By the Way" (acoustic) – 3:34
 "Bliss (I Don't Wanna Know)" (acoustic) – 3:45
 "Oye there you go"

Charts

Weekly charts

Year-end charts

Certifications

Release history

In popular culture
The song is featured in the music-related video games Lips (as downloadable content), Karaoke Revolution Presents: American Idol Encore, Dance Dance Revolution Hottest Party, and Band Hero.

On June 12, 2020, the Canadian Blink-182 podcast 'Blink-155' released a compilation, consisting of 65 covers of "Lips of an Angel", recorded by the members of the Blink-155 fan base (known as the 'Nation' or 'Naysh') as well as the hosts of the podcast, Sam Sutherland & Josiah Hughes. The compilation is titled "It's Really Good to Hear Your Voice", in reference to one of the lyrics of the song. The compilation was mastered by Dan Birch and the artwork was done by Kyle Mabson. All proceeds from the compilation get donated to charities related to the Black Lives Matter movement. Hinder drummer Cody Hanson said of the compilation, "Whether people are making fun of it or not, I think it's awesome either way."

Jack Ingram version

Country music artist Jack Ingram released a version of the song in December 2006. Ingram's version, the lead-off single to his 2007 album This Is It, reached a peak of number 16 on the Billboard Hot Country Songs chart in April 2007.  Ingram's version does not include the last stanza where the singer once again asks why she is calling so late.

Background
Regarding his cover of this song, Ingram gave an explanation in the liner notes of This Is It:

Music video
Premiering in early 2007, the music video for "Lips of an Angel" was directed by Shaun Silva and largely follows the narrative of the song's lyrics, focusing on a late night phone call between the raconteur (Austin Winkler) and his former lover (Emmanuelle Chriqui).

Charts

See also
 List of number-one singles in Australia in 2007
 List of number-one singles in 2007 (New Zealand)
 List of Billboard Mainstream Top 40 number-one songs of 2006

References

2005 songs
2006 singles
Big Machine Records singles
Hinder songs
Jack Ingram songs
Music videos directed by Shaun Silva
Number-one singles in Australia
Number-one singles in New Zealand
Songs about telephone calls
Songs written by Brian Howes
Songs written by Cody Hanson
Universal Republic Records singles
Song recordings produced by Jeremy Stover